The women's 100 metres hurdles event at the 2004 World Junior Championships in Athletics was held in Grosseto, Italy, at Stadio Olimpico Carlo Zecchini on 15 and 16 July.

Medalists

Results

Final
16 July
Wind: -1.0 m/s

Semifinals
16 July

Semifinal 1
Wind: -0.3 m/s

Semifinal 2
Wind: -0.9 m/s

Heats
15 July

Heat 1
Wind: +1.0 m/s

Heat 2
Wind: -0.4 m/s

Heat 3
Wind: +0.4 m/s

Heat 4
Wind: +0.2 m/s

Participation
According to an unofficial count, 30 athletes from 21 countries participated in the event.

References

100 metres hurdles
Sprint hurdles at the World Athletics U20 Championships